Cannonball Funk’n Friends is an album by jazz pianist Roberto Magris released on the JMood label in 2013, featuring performances by the Roberto Magris Quintet with Hermon Mehari, Jim Mair, Dominique Sanders and Alonzo "Scooter" Powell. The album is a tribute to saxophonist Cannonball Adderley and his jazz-funk and soul jazz bands.

Reception

The All About Jazz review by Jack Bowers awarded the album 3½ stars and simply states: "In choosing music for the quintet, Magris focused on 'the groovy side' of Cannonball Adderley's songbook. The mood is cheeky and aggressive from start to finish, and everyone plays well within that framework. What the album does not have, of course, is either of the Adderley brothers, and so it is missing the deep-rooted ebullience they would bring to any such enterprise. Aside from that, an astute and listenable session."

Track listing
 Jeannine (Duke Pearson) – 9:45 
 Blue Daniel (Frank Rosolino) – 5:34 
 Sticks (Julian "Cannonball" Adderley) – 7:17 
 Saudade (Walter Booker) – 8:22 
 Bohemia After Dark (Oscar Pettiford) – 5:32 
 Keep Headed in the Right Direction (Roberto Magris) – 8:13 
 Arriving Soon (Eddie Vinson) – 8:12 
 Outback Special (Roberto Magris) – 8:37 
 Audio Liner Notes – 3:48

Personnel

Musicians
Hermon Mehari – trumpet, cornet
Jim Mair – alto sax
Roberto Magris - piano, Hammond organ
Dominique Sanders - electric bass
 Alonzo “Scooter” Powell - drums

Production
 Paul Collins – executive producer and producer
 George Hunt – engineering
 Stephen Bocioaca – design
 Jerry Lockett and Naima Magris – photography

References

2013 albums
Roberto Magris albums